Velje Selo is a village in the municipality of Bar, Montenegro.

Demographics
According to the 2011 census, its population was 233.

References

Populated places in Bar Municipality